Lee Man-hee (October 6, 1931 – April 13, 1975) was a South Korean film director. His works include Assassin (1969). His daughter, Lee Hye-young, is an actress.

Movies
Kaleidoscope (1961)
A Disobedient Son (1961)
Call 112 (1962)
Until I Die (1962)
Don't Look Back (1963)
The Marines Who Never Returned (1963)
The Twelve Nyang Life (1963)
Han Seok-bong (1963)
Soldiers of YMS504 (1963)
Where Can I Stand? (1964)
The Evil Stairs (aka The Devil's Stairway) (1964)
The Intimidator (1964)
Black Hair (1964)
The Chaser (1964)
Myohyang's Elegy (1964)
Market (1965)
Heukmaek (1965)
The Seven Female POW's (1965)
Heilong River (1965)
A Hero without Serial Number (1966)
Late Autumn(1966)
Unforgettable Woman (1966)
A Water Mill (1966)
Swindler Mr. Heo (1967)
Legend of Ssarigol(1967)
Oblivion (1967)
Horror of Triangle (1967)
Coming Back (1967)
A Spotted Man (1967)
The Starting Point(1967)
Heat and Cold (1967)
Whistle (1967)
Harimao in Bangkok (1967)
Outing (1968)
Living in the Sky (1968)
A Journey (1968)
A Day Off (1968)
Assassin (1969)
Life (1969)
Confess of Woman (1969)
Six Shadows (1969)
Goboi gangui dari (1970)
Break Up the Chain (1971)
The Midnight Sun (1972)
4 o'clock, Nineteen Fifty (1972)
Japanese Pirate (1972)
Cheongnyeo(1974)
The Wild Flowers in the Battle Field (1974)
A Girl Who Looks Like the Sun (1974)
A Triangular Trap (1974)
The Road to Sampo (1975)

References

External links

1975 deaths
1931 births
South Korean film directors
South Korean screenwriters
20th-century screenwriters
Best Director Paeksang Arts Award (film) winners